Goose step may refer to:

 Goose step, a special form of the equal step, which is usually demonstrated in solemn military parades
 The Goose-Step (book), a 1923 book by Upton Sinclair
 The Goose-Step, a manoeuvre made famous by Australian Rugby Union player David Campese
 The Goose Steps Out a 1942 film comedy starring Will Hay
 Goose Step (film) based on the novel of the same name by Shepard Traube filmed as Hitler – Beast of Berlin